Bay Pines is a census-designated place (CDP) in Pinellas County, Florida, United States. The population was 2,931 at the 2010 census. The community is home to Bay Pines Veterans Hospital and Bay Pines National Cemetery.

Historic district
The Bay Pines Veterans Administration Home and Hospital Historic District is a U.S. historic district located at 10000 Bay Pines Blvd. in Bay Pines, Florida. The district contains prehistoric aboriginal sites, and 14 Mediterranean Revival style hospital buildings constructed from the 1930s.

It was added to the National Register of Historic Places on June 27, 2012.

Geography
Bay Pines is located at  (27.819235, -82.776658).

According to the United States Census Bureau, the CDP has a total area of 5.8 km (2.2 mi²), of which 3.6 km (1.4 mi²) is land and 2.2 km (0.9 mi²) (38.22%) is water.

Demographics

At the 2000 census there were 3,065 people, 1,465 households, and 879 families in the CDP.  The population density was 851.4/km (2,198.9/mi²).  There were 1,728 housing units at an average density of 480.0/km (1,239.7/mi²).  The racial makeup of the CDP was 97.91% White, 0.23% African American, 0.20% Native American, 0.46% Asian, 0.46% from other races, and 0.75% from two or more races. Hispanic or Latino of any race were 2.35%.

Of the 1,465 households 17.6% had children under the age of 18 living with them, 50.0% were married couples living together, 6.7% had a female householder with no husband present, and 40.0% were non-families. 33.6% of households were one person and 19.5% were one person aged 65 or older.  The average household size was 2.09 and the average family size was 2.66.

The age distribution was 15.8% under the age of 18, 4.3% from 18 to 24, 22.5% from 25 to 44, 26.0% from 45 to 64, and 31.4% 65 or older.  The median age was 50 years. For every 100 females, there were 91.3 males.  For every 100 females age 18 and over, there were 87.6 males.

The median household income was $32,456 and the median family income  was $38,412. Males had a median income of $31,447 versus $24,886 for females. The per capita income for the CDP was $20,041.  About 1.2% of families and 3.5% of the population were below the poverty line, including 2.0% of those under age 18 and 4.4% of those age 65 or over.

References

Unincorporated communities in Pinellas County, Florida
Census-designated places in Pinellas County, Florida
Census-designated places in Florida
Unincorporated communities in Florida